Owen Wells (December 9, 1950–April 27, 1993) was an American basketball player. A 6'7" forward, he attended the University of Detroit Mercy and went to English High School in Boston, Massachusetts. Wells played 33 games for the Houston Rockets during the 1974-75 NBA season, averaging 3.0 points per game.

Wells also had a stint in Australia's National Basketball League with the Sydney Supersonics, during which time he won the NBL Most Valuable Player award in 1983.

Wells died in 1993 after suffering a stroke.

References

External links

1950 births
1993 deaths
American expatriate basketball people in Australia
American expatriate basketball people in Italy
American expatriate basketball people in the Netherlands
American men's basketball players
Basketball players from Rhode Island
Detroit Mercy Titans men's basketball players
Houston Rockets draft picks
Houston Rockets players
Newcastle Falcons (basketball) players
Small forwards
Sportspeople from Providence, Rhode Island
Tampa Bay Thrillers players
Virtus Bologna players
BV Amstelveen players